Echinoparyphium elegans is a species of trematode. Intermediate hosts include snails, bivalves, and fish. Definitive hosts are mainly birds and mammals.

References

Plagiorchiida
Animals described in 1899